"" ("the Day of Wrath") is a Latin sequence attributed to either Thomas of Celano of the Franciscans (1200–1265) or to Latino Malabranca Orsini (d. 1294), lector at the Dominican  at Santa Sabina, the forerunner of the Pontifical University of Saint Thomas Aquinas (the ) in Rome. The sequence dates from the 13th century at the latest, though it is possible that it is much older, with some sources ascribing its origin to St. Gregory the Great (d. 604), Bernard of Clairvaux (1090–1153), or Bonaventure (1221–1274).

It is a medieval Latin poem characterized by its accentual stress and rhymed lines. The metre is trochaic. The poem describes the Last Judgment, the trumpet summoning souls before the throne of God, where the saved will be delivered and the unsaved cast into eternal flames.

It is best known from its use in the Roman Rite Requiem (Mass for the Dead or Funeral Mass). An English version is found in various Anglican Communion service books.

The first melody set to these words, a Gregorian chant, is one of the most quoted in musical literature, appearing in the works of many composers. The final couplet, has been often reused as an independent song.

Use in the Roman liturgy
The "" has been used in the Extraordinary Form of the Roman Rite  liturgy as the sequence for the Requiem Mass for centuries, as made evident by the important place it holds in musical settings such as those by Mozart and Verdi. It appears in the Roman Missal of 1962, the last edition before the implementation of the revisions that occurred after the Second Vatican Council. As such, it is still heard in churches where the Tridentine Latin liturgy is celebrated. It also formed part of the pre-conciliar liturgy of All Souls' Day.

In the reforms to the Catholic Church's Latin liturgical rites ordered by the Second Vatican Council, the "Consilium for the Implementation of the Constitution on the Liturgy", the Vatican body charged with drafting and implementing the reforms (1969–70), eliminated the sequence as such from funerals and other Masses for the Dead. A leading figure in the post-conciliar liturgical reforms, Archbishop Annibale Bugnini, explains the rationale of the Consilium:

"" remains as a hymn ad libitum in the Liturgy of the Hours during the last week before Advent, divided into three parts for the Office of Readings, Lauds and Vespers.

Text
The Latin text below is taken from the Requiem Mass in the 1962 Roman Missal. The first English version below, translated by William Josiah Irons in 1849, albeit from a slightly different Latin text, replicates the rhyme and metre of the original. This translation, edited for more conformance to the official Latin, is approved by the Catholic Church for use as the funeral Mass sequence in the liturgy of the Anglican ordinariate. The second English version is a more formal equivalence translation.

Because the last two stanzas differ markedly in structure from the preceding stanzas, some scholars consider them to be an addition made in order to suit the great poem for liturgical use. The penultimate stanza, discards the consistent scheme of rhyming triplets in favour of a pair of rhyming couplets. The last stanza, abandons rhyme for assonance, and, moreover, its lines are catalectic.

In the liturgical reforms of 1969–71, stanza 19 was deleted and the poem divided into three sections: 1–6 (for Office of Readings), 7–12 (for Lauds) and 13–18 (for Vespers). In addition,  in stanza 13 was replaced by  so that that line would now mean, "You who absolved the sinful woman". This was because modern scholarship denies the common mediæval identification of the woman taken in adultery with Mary Magdalene, so Mary could no longer be named in this verse. In addition, a doxology is given after stanzas 6, 12 and 18:

Manuscript sources
The text of the sequence is found, with slight verbal variations, in a 13th-century manuscript in the Biblioteca Nazionale Vittorio Emanuele III at Naples. It is a Franciscan calendar missal that must date between 1253 and 1255 for it does not contain the name of Clare of Assisi, who was canonized in 1255, and whose name would have been inserted if the manuscript were of later date.

Inspiration
A major inspiration of the hymn seems to have come from the Vulgate translation of Zephaniah 1:15–16:

From the Jewish liturgy, the prayer Unetanneh Tokef appears to be related: "We shall ascribe holiness to this day, For it is awesome and terrible"; "the great trumpet is sounded", etc.

Other translations
A number of English translations of the poem have been written and proposed for liturgical use. A very loose Protestant version was made by John Newton; it opens:

Jan Kasprowicz, a Polish poet, wrote a hymn entitled  which describes the Judgment day. The first six lines (two stanzas) follow the original hymn's metre and rhyme structure, and the first stanza translates to "The trumpet will cast a wondrous sound".

The American writer Ambrose Bierce published a satiric version of the poem in his 1903 book Shapes of Clay, preserving the original metre but using humorous and sardonic language; for example, the second verse is rendered:

The Rev. Bernard Callan (1750–1804), an Irish priest and poet, translated it into Gaelic around 1800. His version is included in a Gaelic prayer book, The Spiritual Rose.

Literary references
 Walter Scott used the first two stanzas in the sixth canto of his narrative poem "The Lay of the Last Minstrel" (1805).
 Johann Wolfgang von Goethe used the first, the sixth and the seventh stanza of the hymn in the scene "Cathedral" in the first part of his drama Faust (1808).
 Oscar Wilde's "Sonnet on Hearing the Dies Iræ Sung in the Sistine Chapel" (Poems, 1881), contrasts the "terrors of red flame and thundering" depicted in the hymn with images of "life and love".
 In Gaston Leroux's 1910 novel The Phantom of the Opera, Erik (the Phantom) has the chant displayed on the wall of his funereal bedroom.
 It is the inspiration for the title and major theme of the 1964 novel  by Philip K. Dick and Roger Zelazny. The English translation is used verbatim in Dick's novel Ubik two years later.

Music

Musical settings

The words of "" have often been set to music as part of the Requiem service. In some settings, it is broken up into several movements; in such cases, "" refers only to the first of these movements, the others being titled according to their respective incipits.

The original setting was a sombre plainchant (or Gregorian chant). It is in the Dorian mode. In four-line neumatic notation, it begins:

In 5-line staff notation:
 

The earliest surviving polyphonic setting of the Requiem by Johannes Ockeghem does not include "". The first polyphonic settings to include the "" are by Engarandus Juvenis (1490) and Antoine Brumel (1516) to be followed by many composers of the renaissance. Later, many notable choral and orchestral settings of the Requiem including the sequence were made by composers such as Mozart, Berlioz, Verdi, Britten and Stravinsky. Giovanni Battista Martini ended his set of (mostly humorous) 303 canons with a set of 20 on extracts of the sequence poem.

Musical quotations
The traditional Gregorian melody has been used as a theme or musical quotation in many classical compositions, including:

 Thomas Adès – Totentanz (2013)
 Charles-Valentin Alkan – Souvenirs: , Op. 15 (1837)
 Eric Ball – "Resurgam" (1950)
 Hector Berlioz –  (1830), Requiem (1837)
 Ernest Bloch –  (1944)
 Johannes Brahms – Six Pieces for Piano, Op. 118, No. 6, Intermezzo in E-flat minor (1893)
 Mario Castelnuovo-Tedesco – , Op. 195: "XII. " (plate 24) (1961)
 Marc-Antoine Charpentier –   H.12 (1670)
 George Crumb – Black Angels (1970)
 Luigi Dallapiccola - Canti di prigionia
 Michael Daugherty – Metropolis Symphony 5th movement, "Red Cape Tango"; Dead Elvis for bassoon and chamber ensemble (1993)
 Ern%C5%91 Dohn%C3%A1nyi - no. 4 (E-flat minor) of "Four Rhapsodies" for Piano, op. 11
 Alberto Ginastera – Bomarzo, Op. 34 (1967)
 Alexander Glazunov – From the Middle Ages Suite, No. 2 "Scherzo", Op. 79 (1902)
 Charles Gounod – Faust opera, act 4 (1859)
 Joseph Haydn – Symphony No. 103, "The Drumroll" (1795)
 Gustav Holst – The Planets, movement 5, "Saturn, the Bringer of Old Age"
 Arthur Honegger – , H. 131 (1938)
 Hans Huber quotes the melody in the second movement ("Funeral March") of his Symphony No. 3 in C major, Op. 118 (Heroic, 1908).
 Alexander Kastalsky – Requiem for Fallen Brothers, movements 3 and 4 (1917) 
 Aram Khachaturian – Symphony No. 2 (1944)
 Teofil Klonowski - Preludes on Polish Church Hymns: Dies Irae (1867)
 György Ligeti – Le Grand Macabre (1974–77)
 Franz Liszt – Totentanz (1849)
 Jean-Baptiste Lully –  LWV 64/1 (1683)
 Gustav Mahler – Symphony No. 2, movements 1 and 5 (1888–94)
 Jules Massenet - Eve (1874)
 Modest Mussorgsky – Songs and Dances of Death, No. 3 "Trepak" (1875)
 Nikolai Myaskovsky – Symphony No. 6, Op. 23 (1921–23); Piano Sonata No.2, Op.13
 Vítězslav Novák – used the theme near the end of his May Symphony
 Camille Saint-Saëns – ; Symphony No. 3 (Organ Symphony), Requiem (1878)
 Dmitri Shostakovich – Symphony No. 14; Aphorisms, Op. 13 – No. 7, "Dance of Death" (1969)
 Kaikhosru Shapurji Sorabji –  (1948–49) and nine other works
 Pyotr Ilyich Tchaikovsky – Modern Greek Song (In Dark Hell) Op. 16 No. 6 (1872); 6 Pieces on a Single Theme op 21 (1873); Orchestral Suite No. 3 (1884); Manfred Symphony  (1885)
 Eugène Ysaÿe – Solo Violin Sonata in A minor, Op. 27, No. 2 "Obsession" (1923)
 Bernd Alois Zimmermann – Musique pour les soupers du roi Ubu

It has also been used in many film scores and popular works, such as:
 Bathory - on album Blood Fire Death (1988)
 Wendy Carlos and Rachel Elkind – Opening theme for The Shining (1980)
 Danny Elfman – "Making Christmas" from The Nightmare Before Christmas (1993)
 Gerald Fried – Opening theme for The Return of Dracula, 1958
 Diamanda Galás – Masque of the Red Death: Part I – The Divine Punishment
 Jerry Goldsmith – The Mephisto Waltz (1971)
 Donald Grantham – Baron Cimetiére's Mambo (2004)
 Bernard Herrmann quoted in the main theme for Citizen Kane (1941)
 Bernard Herrmann – Jason and the Argonauts (1963) (quoted during the scene of the scattering of the hydra's teeth)
 Gottfried Huppertz – Score for Metropolis (1927)
 Jethro Tull – The instrumental track "Elegy" featured on the band's 12th studio album Stormwatch is based on the melody.
 Robert Lopez and Kristen Anderson-Lopez – Frozen II (soundtrack), "Into the Unknown" (2019)
 Harry Manfredini – main title theme for Friday the 13th Part VI: Jason Lives (1986)
 The Melvins - on their album "Nude with Boots" (2008)
 Alan Menken, Stephen Schwartz – The Hunchback of Notre Dame (1996) soundtrack; "The Bells of Notre Dame" features passages from the first and second stanzas as lyrics.
 Ennio Morricone – "Penance" from his score for The Mission (1986)
 Lionel Newman - Compulsion (1959 film)
 Leonard Rosenman – the main theme of The Car (1977)
 Stephen Sondheim – Sweeney Todd – quoted in "The Ballad of Sweeney Todd" and the accompaniment to "Epiphany" (1979)
 John Williams – "Old Man Marley" leitmotif from his score for Home Alone (1990)
 Hans Zimmer – "Rock House Jail" from The Rock soundtrack
Guy Gross - "Salve me Lacrimosa" from the Canadian-Australian television series Farscape

References

External links
 
 
 "Dies Iræ", Franciscan Archive. Includes two Latin versions and a literal English translation.
 Day of Wrath, O Day of Mourning (translation by William Josiah Irons)
 A website cataloging Musical Quotations of the Dies Irae plainchant melody in secular classical music

13th-century Christian texts
13th-century Latin literature
13th-century poems
Book of Zephaniah
Catholic liturgy
Judgment in Christianity
Latin religious words and phrases
Latin-language Christian hymns
Requiems
Works of uncertain authorship